How to Survive Being Single (Spanish: Cómo sobrevivir soltero), is a Mexican comedy streaming television series created by Sebastián and Emiliano Zurita, and Marcos Bucay as showrunner for Amazon Prime Video, based on certain aspects of Sebastian's life. The series is produced by Campanario Entertainment, and Addiction House, and distributed by Sony Pictures Television. The first season is composed of 10 half-hour episodes. The show revolves around Sebastián (Sebastián Zurita), an actor who lives stuck in a famous character that he has not been able to part with. Because of this, he loses his 10-year relationship with Lucía, and now he will have to live in the new world of singleness. On March 30, 2021, the series was renewed for a second and third season

Plot 
Sebastián, a Mexican actor, has a seemingly perfect life that will be twisted when his girlfriend had been for more than a decade, deceives him. His compress is broken and it seems that his life reaches a point of no return, sinking rapidly. Sebastián will return to the world of dating as a new single and, discover that his faculties to flirt are not the best. The rest of your single friends will help you discover that there are other single people who find it hard to find love. The Mexican series explores the advantages and disadvantages of being single in a culture in which man prevails.

Cast 
 Sebastián Zurita as Sebastián
 Roberto Flores as Daniel
 Pamela Almanza as Lucía
 Lucía Gómez-Robledo as Mafer
 Fabrizio Santini as Fish 
 Octavio Hinojosa as Gonzalo
 Tato Alexander as Fabiana
 Memo Villegas as Adán Farré
 Justina Bustos as Natalia
 Juana Arias as Julieta
 Alfonso Herrera as himself (cameo)
 Christian Chávez as himself (cameo)
 Maite Perroni as herself (cameo)

Episodes

References 

Mexican television series
Spanish-language television shows
Spanish-language Amazon Prime Video original programming
Amazon Prime Video original programming
2020 Mexican television series debuts
2020 Mexican television series endings
2020s Mexican comedy television series
Sony Pictures Television telenovelas